Henry Jansen or Janssen may refer to:

Henry J. Janssen (1860–1922), member of the Wisconsin State Assembly
Henry Jansen (politician), see 35th and 36th New York State Legislature
Henry Janssen of the Janssen baronets
Henry Janssen (Canadian football), see 1974 CFL Draft
Henry Jansen, musician with Dovetail Joint